Jewish volunteers in the Spanish Civil War refers to Jews who joined International Brigades and fought in the Spanish Civil War,  which erupted on July 17, 1936 and ended on  April 1, 1939.

History
The fighting was between the Republicans, who were loyal to the Spanish Republic, and the Nationalists, a rebel group led by General Francisco Franco. The Nationalists prevailed and Franco would rule Spain for the next 36 years. The coup was supported by military units in Morocco, Pamplona, Burgos, Valladolid, Cádiz, Cordova, and Seville. However, barracks in important cities such as Madrid, Barcelona, Valencia, Bilbao and Málaga did not join in the rebellion. Spain was thus left militarily and politically divided. The rebels, led by General Franco, then embarked upon an almost three-year war against the government for the control of the country. The rebel forces received support from the Third Reich, the Kingdom of Italy, and neighboring Portugal, while the Soviet Union and Mexico intervened in support of the Republican side. Other countries, such as the United Kingdom and France, operated an official policy of non-intervention.

A minority of the Jewish population, particularly that of Europe, were active in socialist and Communist organisations in the period between the two World Wars.

They made up a considerable portion of the socialist volunteers, with estimates putting the figure at over ten per cent. Many of them joined the International Brigades and the Popular Front to fight in the Spanish Civil War on the side of the Republicans. The leadership of the International Brigades considered forming an entirely Jewish brigade, but the high casualties made this impossible. However, a Jewish company, the Naftali Botwin Company, was formed within the Palafox Battalion.

At least one Jewish volunteer is known to have served with the Nationalists. Emanual Rudolph Vischer was a former Oberleutnant of the Swiss Army who had lived in Spain prior to the Civil War. The official journal of the Swiss Armed Forces reported his death in September 1936.

National origin of volunteers
The table below displays the national origin of the Jewish volunteers in the International Brigades.

{| class="wikitable"
|-
! Nationality
! Number of volunteers
|-
|Poland
|2,250
|-
|United States
|1,250
|-
|France
|1,043
|-
|Palestine (Future State of Israel)
|500
|-
|Germany
|400
|-
|Britain
|200–400
|-
|Belgium
|200
|-
|Austria-Hungary
|120–150
|-
|Canada
|71
|-
|Soviet Union
|53
|}

Notable figures
Seweryn Ajzner - later academic and scientist in communist Poland
Alfred Angiersztajn - later high trade unions official in communist Poland
Shimon Avidan – Palestinian Jew and future Israeli military officer
Aleksander Bekier - later high MFA official in communist Poland
Alfred Brauner – French Austrian communist, scholar and author
Michał Bron - later high military and MFA official in communist Poland
Mieczysław Broniatowski - later high security official in communist Poland
Robert Domany – Croatian Partisan and a People's Hero of Yugoslavia
Gershon Dua-Bogen – later Polish communist party official
Grzegorz Dzierzgowski - later high military, MFA and economics official in communist Poland
Józef Epstein - Polish communist, later in French resistance
Stanisław Flato - later high military and MFA official in communist Poland
Fernando Gerassi – Turkish artist
Kurt Julius Goldstein – International Brigader, Holocaust survivor, and author
Szlama Grzywacz - Polish communist, later in French resistance
David Guest – communist British mathematician and philosopher
Juliusz Hibner - later high security and interior official in communist Poland
Salomon Jaszuński - Polish communist
Bolesław Jeleń - later high military and MFA official in communist Poland
 – banned German writer (also known as Helmuth Campe)
Pinkus Kartin - later in Polish communist resistance
Lou Kenton – British potter
 –  Croatian student
Wacław Komar - later high security and military official in communist Poland
Franciszek Kriegel - Polish communist, later high health care official in communist Czechoslovakia
Bert "Yank" Levy – a Canadian who famously used his experience to teach the British Home Guard and wrote a text on guerrilla warfare  His service in the Civil War was memorialized in a comic book.
Eugenia Łozińska - later journalist and propagandist in communist Poland
Vladimir Majder – Croatian Partisan and communist
Stanisław Matuszczak - later mid-range party and trade unions official in communist Poland
Wiktor Mencel - later high MFA official in communist Poland
Mieczysław Mietkowski - later high security and business official in communist Poland
Emanuel Mink - Botwin Company commander, later mid-range security official in communist Poland
George Nathan – Chief of Staff of the XV International Brigade
Roman Orłowski - later high security official in communist Poland
Abe Osheroff – American communist
Valter Roman – Romanian politician
Carlo Rosselli – headed the Matteotti Battalion
Leon Rubinsztein - Botwin Company commander, later high security and economics official in communist Poland
Leon Samet - later high military official in communist Poland
Alfred Sherman – British journalist and adviser to Margaret Thatcher
Jack Shulman – American communist
Mieczysław Skorupiński - later mid-range security and business official in communist Poland
Manfred Stern alias General Emilio Kléber
Henryk Sternhel - later in Polish communist resistance
Mieczysław Szleyen - later high military official in communist Poland
Zofia Szleyen - later propagandist and translator in communist Poland
Eugeniusz Szyr - later deputy prime minister and high official in communist Poland
Drago Štajnberger – Croatian Partisan and a People's Hero of Yugoslavia
Henryk Toruńczyk - later high security and economics official in communist Poland
Saul Wellman – political commissar of the Lincoln Battalion and the Washington Battalion
Milton Wolff – commander of the Lincoln Battalion
Máté Zalka – Hungarian communist

References

Further reading

Jewish Volunteers in the Spanish Civil War, Abraham Lincoln Brigade Archives. (2008).
Internationalism & the Spanish Civil War, Abraham Lincoln Brigade Archives. (2008).

External links
300 German and Austrian brigadists in French internment camp on jewishtraces.org
Martin Sugarman, Jews in the Spanish Civil War
Saul Wellman Archive
Gerben Zaagsma, Jewish volunteers in the Spanish Civil War
Mitch Abidor, The Naftali Botwin Company

Foreign volunteers in the Spanish Civil War
 
Jewish military history
Jewish military personnel

Jewish Spanish history
Jewish anti-fascists